Ten, TEN or 10 may refer to:
 10, an even natural number following 9 and preceding 11
 one of the years 10 BC, AD 10, 1910 and 2010
 October, the tenth month of the year

Places
 Mount Ten, in Vietnam
 Tongren Fenghuang Airport (IATA code), China
 10 (Los Angeles Railway)
 TEN Atlantic City, Casino hotel resort in New Jersey

People and characters
 Tussenvoegsel prefix in Dutch surnames
 Jeremy Ten (born 1989), Canadian competitive figure skater
 Sergey Ten (born 1976), Russian politician
 Vicente Ten (born 1966), Spanish politician
 Ten Miyagi (born 2001), Japanese footballer

Characters
 Ten, a character from Urusei Yatsura
 Tenshinhan, nicknamed "Ten", a character from Dragon Ball

Art and entertainment

Music 
 Ten (singer), a Thai singer and member of South Korean boy group NCT
 Ten (band), a British melodic rock/hard rock band
 Tenuto or Ten., a direction in musical notation
 Ten, the runner-up contestant in the fourth season of the singing competition The Sing-Off
 TEN Music Group, a Swedish record label

Albums 
 10 (Enuff Z'nuff album), the 9th studio album by the Rock band Enuff Z'Nuff
 #10 (The Guess Who album), 1973
 10 (Hombres G album), 2007
 10 (Kate Rusby album), 2002
 10 (LL Cool J album), 2002
 10 (New Kids on the Block album), 2013
 10 (MercyMe album),  2009
 10 (The Stranglers album), the tenth studio album from The Stranglers
 10 (Wet Wet Wet album), the seventh studio album by Wet Wet Wet
 10 (Ginger album), a compilation album by The Wildhearts
 10 (Hunter album), 2010
 10 (John Anderson album), 1988
 10 (The Piano Guys album), 2020
 10 (Nikos Oikonomopoulos album), 2017
 10 (Sault album) (also styled "X"), 2022
 Ten (Trooper album), 1991
 Ten (Brian McKnight album), the 8th album by Brian McKnight
 Ten (Clouddead album), 2004
 Ten (Gabriella Cilmi album), 2010
 Ten (Girls Aloud album), 2012
 Ten (Jason Moran album), 2010
 Ten (Pearl Jam album), 1991
 Ten (Ten album), the debut studio album by Ten
 Ten (Y&T album), 1990
 10, an album by Liroy
 10, an album by Johan Johansson
 Ten, an album by Clammbon
 10, an album by Tarkan, 2017
 10 (Spice album), 2021
 10, an album by Westside Gunn, 2022

Songs 
 "Ten" (song), a 2010 song by Jewel
 "Ten", a 2004 song by Monika Brodka
"10", a 1998 song by Blonde Redhead from In an Expression of the Inexpressible
"10", a song by Happy Diving

Film 

 10 (film), a 1979 American romantic comedy
 Ten (2002 film), an Iranian docufiction film
 The Ten, a 2007 American anthology comedy film
 Ten (2013 film), a British action drama film
 Ten, a 2014 American action thriller film, retitled Sabotage
 Ten (2014 film), a thriller/horror film
 10 (2022 film), a 2022 Indian sports film

Television

 Network 10, an Australian commercial television network
 TEN (TV station), Sydney Network Ten flagship station
 The Erotic Network, an American pay-per-view service
 Sony Ten, an Indian pay TV sports network
 10 (miniseries), a 2010 Swiss series about a poker game
 "Ten", an episode of Men Behaving Badly

Literature 
 Ten (manga), by Nobuyuki Fukumoto
 TEN: The Enthusiast Network, an American magazine publishing company

Other arts and entertainment 
 The Ten or Ten American Painters, an 1897 artist group
 Total Entertainment Network, a mid-1990s online matchmaking service for PC video games

Other uses 
 Airwave Ten, an Austrian paraglider design
 Tennessee Titans of the National Football League
 Then language or Ten, a language spoken in Guizhou, China
 Toxic epidermal necrolysis, also known as Lyell's Syndrome, a life-threatening dermatological condition
 Trans-European Networks, a 1992 group formed by the European Union for economic purposes
 Windows 10, an operating system
 ⑩, the Stenhaus-Moser number, also called megiston

See also 

 010 (disambiguation)
 10s, the decade from 1 Jan 10 AD to 31 Dec 19 AD
 Number 10 (disambiguation)
 Episode 10 (disambiguation)
 Perfect 10 (disambiguation)
 Model 10 (disambiguation)
 Ten. (disambiguation)
 TENS (disambiguation)
 Tenten (disambiguation)
 The Ten (disambiguation)
 X (disambiguation)
 TEN Group (disambiguation)
 Ten Brothers (disambiguation)
 1O (disambiguation)